The Kansas House of Representatives is the lower house of the legislature of the U.S. state of Kansas. Composed of 125 state representatives from districts with roughly equal populations of at least 19,000, its members are responsible for crafting and voting on legislation, helping to create a state budget, and legislative oversight over state agencies. Representatives are elected to two-year terms. The Kansas House of Representatives does not have term limits. The legislative session convenes at the Kansas State Capitol in Topeka annually.

History
On January 29, 1861, President James Buchanan authorized Kansas to become the 34th state of United States, a free state. The ratification of the Kansas Constitution created the Kansas House of Representatives as the lower house of the state legislature.

Members of the Kansas House voted to impeach Governor Charles L. Robinson in 1862, but the impeachment trial did not lead to his conviction and removal of office. The Kansas Senate did vote to impeach the secretary of state and state auditor for the unlawful sale of bonds, but only three state senators voted for the governor's impeachment.

In 1870, the Kansas House of Representatives first met at the Kansas State Capitol, which was not officially completed until 1903.

Populists and Republicans both claimed control of the Kansas House of Representatives in 1893, with the Populists accusing the Republican Party of election fraud. The dispute led to separate Populist-led and Republican-led Houses in 1893 until the Kansas Supreme Court sided with the Republicans and the Populist-led House disbanded.

In 1918, Minnie J. Grinstead became the first female elected to the House.

In 1966, the state legislature began to hold annual general sessions and a constitutional amendment adopted at the 1974 general election extended the duration of the session held in the even-numbered years to 90 calendar days, subject to extension by a vote of two-thirds of the elected membership of each house.

United States presidential candidate Bob Dole, the 1996 Republican nominee, began his political career with a two-year term in the Kansas House of Representatives after his election in 1950.

Legislative procedure
State representatives introduce a proposed law in the Kansas House of Representatives in the form of a bill, which must be approved by a standing committee, the Committee of the Whole and the entire membership of the chamber. Other state representatives can amend a bill in committee or on the floor of the chamber.

A bill must be approved by both houses of the Kansas Legislature in order to be submitted to the governor, who can sign it into law or veto the bill. State legislators can override the veto with the support of two-thirds majority of both houses.

Party composition
Republicans have controlled the chamber for all but six years since statehood, and without interruption since 1993. The GOP presently holds a supermajority in the chamber. The following is the official make-up for the 2023-2024 session:

Leadership
The Speaker of the Kansas House of Representatives is the leader of the chamber and is elected by his fellow state representatives. The speaker presides over the legislative process on the floor of the chamber or appoints a presiding officer. The speaker decides the committee structure. The majority and minority leaders, are elected by their respective party caucuses relative to their party's strength in the chamber.

Officers

Members of the Kansas House of Representatives

Committee leadership

2023–2024

Past composition of the House of Representatives

See also
 List of Kansas state legislatures

References

External links
 Kansas House of Representatives
 Interactive Map of Kansas House and Senate Districts
 Search Kansas Legislators Past & Present
 Kansas Oral History Project

Kansas Legislature
State lower houses in the United States